Anaphalis arfakensis is a species of flowering plants within the family Asteraceae. It is an endemic species found in New Guinea.

References

Flora of New Guinea
arfakensis